The World Currency Unit WOCU (XCU) is an EU trademarked synthetic global currency quotation. It is derived from a weighted basket of currencies of fiat currency pairs covering the top 20 economies of the world. Each country’s currency representation is weighted by its relative proportion of the top 20 economies as measured by GDP. The WOCU’s nearest comparator was the more narrowly constructed ECU, the European Currency Unit basket that preceded the successor Euro.

The WOCU offers a transparent, relatively stable currency quotation as a hub currency reference for cross border trade to reduce volatility and risk. It reacts to the economic growth and decline of constituent country economies, adjusting the prominence of their respective currencies. The WOCU is outputted in up to real time, in sub second updates. Input FX data is sourced from global aggregated FX data providers.

Countries within the Eurozone (those that have replaced their national currencies with the Euro) are treated as individual countries in the WOCU weighting calculation. This means that some countries within the Eurozone are included, such as Germany, whilst others are excluded, such as Ireland, purely on the basis of that country’s top 20 GDP qualification or disqualification. The GDP values of each country issued by the International Monetary Fund in its World Economic Outlook forecast are reviewed as these figures become available and a biannual re-weighting of the benchmark basket performed. This means that the member countries included in the basket, and therefore their currencies, may change up to twice a year either by the weighting for their currency being adjusted (up or down) or by their fiat currency being promoted into or demoted out of the basket. This generally results in the basket consisting of 15 separate currencies, the Euro currency being common to normally 6 nation states included in the WOCU basket.

Review and approval of weighting adjustments is subject to a confirmation process overseen by the WOCU Oversight Committee, a body consisting of a majority of independent persons qualified and authorized to approve or reject any change to the constitution of the WOCU. In the circumstance of a reweighting where a country changes its currency, the replacement country currency FX data will form exactly the same proportion of the WOCU and the former currency will be dropped (or reduced in the case of the Euro) in the same proportion at the same time that the relevant country officially introduces its new currency, which shall be assessed and approved by the WOCU Oversight Committee.

The WOCU is used to price commodities such as bunker fuel and as a reference currency for global investors and companies seeking to mitigate bilateral exchange rate volatility.

In early 2019, Unite Global AS, a Norway incorporated provider of a Correspondent banking hub platform for cross border banking payments and real-time settlement  revealed it was in discussions for the issuance and distribution of WOCU currency.

See also

Special drawing rights
Bancor
European Currency Unit
Ven (currency)
World currency unit
World currency

References

 Coats, Warren (1989) "In Search of a Monetary Anchor : A 'New' Monetary Standard", IMF Working Paper No. 89/82.
 Staff of the International Monetary Fund (2009) "World Economic Outlook, October 2009: Sustaining the Recovery", October 15, 2009
 Kang, Shi, Juanyi Xu (2008) "The Optimal Currency Basket with Input Currency  and Output Currency", HKIMR Working Paper No. 17/2008

External links 
Official website

International finance
Foreign exchange market